Culex lineata is a species of mosquito in the genus Culex.

Distribution
Mozambique, South Africa

References

lineata
Insects described in 1912
Diptera of Africa